Matt Gordon (born 2 November 1994) is an Australian rugby union player for Ealing Trailfinders in the RFU Championship. Gordon's primary position is centre.

Rugby Union career

Professional career

Gordon represented both  and  before moving to England to join London Scottish. He joined Edinburgh in May 2020 but moved to Ealing Trailfinders in March 2021.

External links
itsrugby Profile

References

1994 births
Living people
Edinburgh Rugby players
Rugby union centres
Rugby union players from Queensland